Lanthanosuchus is an extinct genus of parareptile from the Late Permian. It was found at Isheevo in Tatarstan. Lanthanosuchus had a length of 75 cm.

References 

Procolophonomorphs
Permian reptiles of Asia
Prehistoric reptile genera